= Third Russian Revolution =

Third Russian Revolution may refer to one of the following events.

- Left-wing uprisings against the Bolsheviks, in the terminology of anarchists
- Perestroika (1980s–1990s), a political movement for reformation within the Communist Party of the Soviet Union
  - Dissolution of the Soviet Union, 1991
- October Revolution, 1917
